Four is a 2012 American independent feature film written and directed by Joshua Sanchez.  It is based on the 1998 play of the same name by Christopher Shinn.  The film stars Wendell Pierce, Emory Cohen, Aja Naomi King and E.J. Bonilla. The film premiered at the 2012 Los Angeles Film Festival where its ensemble cast won the top acting award.  E.J. Bonilla received an Imagen Award nomination for his performance and Wendell Pierce received an Independent Spirit Award nomination for his performance.

Cast 

 Wendell Pierce as Joe
 Emory Cohen as June
 Aja Naomi King as Abigayle
 E.J. Bonilla as Dexter
 Yolonda Ross as Abigayle's Mother
 Liam Benzvi as Todd
 Kathryn Meisle as June's Mom

Production 

Four took over five years to make and the film started several times before it was actually made. Sanchez met Christopher Shinn in 2003 while he was working for an online magazine and was assigned to interview Shinn. Sanchez had read all of Shinn's plays as research for the interview, which is how he first came to read Shinn's play, Four. Sanchez wanted to option Four right away, but another filmmaker had already optioned it.  A year later, the other filmmaker did not renew the option on the play, so Sanchez stepped in.

To raise money for the film, Sanchez and his producer, Christine Giorgio, were among some of the first artists to use the crowdfunding website, Kickstarter in December 2009. They successfully raised nearly $20,000 for their initial campaign.

Film director, and playwright, Neil LaBute, executive produced the film along with renowned photographer, Allen Frame.

Themes 

The film is a requiem for loneliness, conformity and desire quietly hidden in the everyday norms of suburban American life and touches on several cultural boundaries, including sexuality, class and race.  Three of the film's four main characters are people of color.

About Four Sanchez said:

Release 

The film was released on September 13, 2013.

Reception

Accolades

References

External links 

 
 

2012 films
2012 drama films
American drama films
American independent films
American films based on plays
Films set in the United States
Kickstarter-funded films
2012 independent films
2010s English-language films
2010s American films